Christos Patsatzoglou (born 19 March 1979) is a Greek former professional footballer of Romani origin who last played for APO Aetos Korydallou.

Patsatzoglou started his career in Skoda Xanthi before being transferred to Olympiacos where he won several national titles. He then moved to Omonia in Cyprus where he won the double. Patsatzoglou also had spells with AEK Athens and PAS Giannina. Patsatzoglou has also been capped in no less than 45 occasions with Greece.

Club career

Early life and career
Born and raised in Athens to a Hellenized-Gypsy family and of the Greek Orthodox faith, Christos started playing football for his hometown's local youth team Aghia Eleousa and managed a place in Greece U-17 national team. His talent was spotted by Skoda Xanthi's scouts and he was transferred there in 1996. He played for their first team for 4 years, from 1996–1997 to 1999–2000 where he won the Best Young Player award in his final season in Xanthi in 1999–2000.

Olympiacos
Alongside Giourkas Seitaridis, Christos was considered to be one of Greece's top footballing talents and was pursued to be signed by the country's "Big 3"; Olympiacos F.C., AEK Athens F.C. and Panathinaikos F.C., though he chose to sign with Olympiacos Piraeus. He was a top consistent performer until he was devastatingly injured in 2003, at a derby game between Olympiacos and AEK Athens. Just before he suffered the devastating injury, Christos was in the form of his life while playing for Olympiacos and Greece, as he was such an athletic and brick-wall solid defender at the back and very skillful and sharp going forward and was considered to be one of the top defenders of European football through his performances for Olympiacos while playing in the UEFA Champions League and UEFA Cup and without doubt the best defender in all of Greece through his performances for Olympiacos in the Greek Super League and Greek Football Cup and inevitably, he was being courted by Manchester United F.C. who Olympiakos declined a £6m offer from them as Patsatzoglou after being watched by a scout who was sent to Greece from Old Trafford for a long time to watch his games was in Sir Alex Ferguson's plans to rebuild his defensive lines but Olympiacos were not willing at all to give up their club's and country's star defender as he was so crucial to the success of Olympiacos and one of the pin-up boys of Greek football from the early 2000s and he remained at the Greek giants where down the track he copped a bad injury which kept him sidelined for a long while. He worked to recover from his injury for about two years, and made his comeback near the end of the 2004–2005 season.

He stated that he was healthy again and that it was up to his coach, Trond Sollied to play him now. Sollied was not sure if Patsatzoglou could play again in such a competitive level, but he was willing to give him more chances in the 2005–2006 season.

During the season 2006/2007, Patsatzoglou suffered another knee injury, unrelated to his previous one, at the away Champions League match against Roma. Upon his return, he played a handful of games.

In the 2007–08 season, Patsatzoglou scored the winning the goal in the UEFA Champions League match against Werder Bremen. The goal would lead to Olympiakos' first Champions League away win, finishing 1–3.

Omonia
On 1 June 2009 it was announced that Patsatzoglou will play for his ex-coach Takis Lemonis, this time though for Cypriot club Omonia. Patsatzoglou agreed to a 2-year deal earning €800,000. Patsatzoglou indicated he wants to leave in the summer transfer window and return to Greece. Being played out of position at centre-back has been cited as the reason for his desire to leave. Patsatzoglou only played six league matches due to his long-term injury.

AEK Athens
On 30 August 2010 Patsatzoglou agreed on terms with AEK Athens signing a 1-year deal. Patsatzoglou was also rejoined with manager Dusan Bajevic. Patsatzoglou was given the number 2. Patsatzoglou made his debut for AEK against Panserraikos coming on as a substitute. He is no longer with AEK Athens since January 2011.

PAS Giannina
In January 2011 Patsatzouglou signed for PAS Giannina a team in the second division hoping to get again in Super League Greece. In November 2012 Patsatzoglou, who was on the team for the game against OFI Crete, disappeared making an appeal to the club due to a ten-day delay of a contract' dose. At that time, awaiting the final court decision for the appeal has been filed against PAS Giannina, Patsatzoglou was in England where he tried to open a new page in his career. The Greek international tested in Bolton Wanderers F.C. struggling to convince the team staff. He had also the best recommendations from Stelios Giannakopoulos, whom opinion always counts in «Reebok Stadium». However, if this scenario did not proceed, Patsatzoglou was willing to exhaust every possibility for playing in England, at least until the end of the 2012/13 season.

Later career
In July 2013 Patsatzoglou signed a 2+1 years' contract for Greek Football League club Iraklis Psachna

In July 2015 Patsatzoglou signed a new contract with the local A' Division of Evia Island team AEK Chalkidos. On 1 July 2016 he signed with Chalkida F.C. where he played only 4 matches.

On 26 October 2016 he signed a contract with another Gamma Ethniki club Proodeftiki.

On 29 September 2017 he signed a contract with another Gamma Ethniki club Fostiras.

International career
Patsatzoglou was selected for the 2002 UEFA European Under-21 Championship, although he had already made his full debut against Germany. He appeared once in a qualifying match for UEFA EURO 2004, but not in the final tournament itself.

Patsatzoglou was part of the 23-man squad that represented Greece at Euro 2008. He also participated in the 2010 FIFA World Cup, making two appearances against South Korea and Argentina, both as a substitute.

International goals

Honours

Club
Olympiacos
 Super League Greece (8): 2000–01, 2001–02, 2002–03, 2004–05, 2005–06, 2006–07, 2007–08, 2008–09
  Greek Football Cup (4): 2004–05, 2005–06, 2007–08, 2008–09
 Greek Super Cup (1): 2007

Omonia
 Cypriot First Division (1): 2009–10
 LTV Super Cup (1): 2009–10

Individual
 Best Young Player (1): 1999–2000

References

External links

 
 
 2010 FIFA World Cup profile
 

1979 births
Living people
Association football defenders
Association football wingers
Xanthi F.C. players
Olympiacos F.C. players
AEK Athens F.C. players
Proodeftiki F.C. players
PAS Giannina F.C. players
AC Omonia players
Super League Greece players
Football League (Greece) players
Cypriot First Division players
Greek expatriate footballers
Expatriate footballers in Cyprus
Greek expatriate sportspeople in Cyprus
Greece international footballers
Greece under-21 international footballers
Greek Romani people
Greek people of Romani descent
UEFA Euro 2008 players
2010 FIFA World Cup players
Footballers from Athens
Greek footballers
Romani footballers